Adewale Maja-Pearce (born 1953) is an Anglo-Nigerian writer, journalist and literary critic, who is best known for his documentary essays. He is the author of several books, including the memoirs In My Father's Country (1987) and The House My Father Built (2014), several other non-fiction titles and a collection of short stories entitled Loyalties and Other Stories (1986).

Early years and education
Adewale Maja-Pearce was born in London, England, to British and Yoruba parents. He grew up in Lagos, Nigeria, attending St. Gregory's College, Obalende (1965–69), and returned to Britain for further education at the University College of Wales, Swansea  (BA, 1972–75), and at the School of Oriental and African Studies, London University (1984–86), where he gained a Master of Arts degree in African studies.

Literary career
He was employed a researcher at Index on Censorship and became the journal's Africa Editor (1986–97), as well as becoming consultant and then Series Editor of the Heinemann African Writers Series (1986–94).

Having returned to Nigeria, he lives in Surulere, Lagos, in a house inherited from his father, which he has written about in his 2014 memoir The House My Father Built. Maja-Pearce runs an editorial services agency called Yemaja, as well as a small publishing company, The New Gong.

Writing
Maja-Pearce has written in various genres, his early published work featuring short stories drawing on his Nigerian background, with his collection Loyalties and Other Stories appearing in 1986.

Most notable, however, as an essayist, he has written several non-fiction books, including the 2005 Remembering Ken Saro-Wiwa and Other Essays, which in the opinion of critic Uzor Uzoatu "affords us the opportunity of dipping into the immense world of Maja-Pearce as he, in twenty-three heartfelt essays and reviews, illuminates the benighted mores of modern Nigeria, the identity question in South Africa … and engages with seminal minds across the world. ...This book is a treasure, a profound testament." Maja-Pearce was the editor of Christopher Okigbo's Collected Poems (1986), as well as of anthologies such as The Heinemann Book of African Poetry in English (1990) and Who's Afraid of Wole Soyinka?: Essays on Censorship (1991), and also wrote the 1998 and 1999 annual reports on human rights violations in Nigeria.

His memoirs include 1987's In My Father's Country: A Nigerian Journey and, most recently, The House My Father Built (2014), which the reviewer for the online magazine Bakwa described in the following terms: "a harrowing tale of Nigeria as it then was (1993–1999); a memoir of Adewale Maja-Pearce’s quest to possess his birth right, his country and personal dignity. ...Mr Maja-Pearce presents the greatest cast of characters in the history of Nigerian literature. And nothing comes close, no cliché, except you consider Basi and Company by Ken Saro-Wiwa."

Maja-Pearce has written journalism, essays and reviews for a range of international publications, among them The New York Times, Granta, The London Review of Books, The Times Literary Supplement, The London Magazine, and Prospect. He became a contributing opinion writer for The International New York Times in 2013.

Personal life
Maja-Pearce is married to the artist/activist Juliet Ezenwa.

Bibliography

 In My Father's Country: A Nigerian Journey (William Heinemann, 1987), CreateSpace Independent Publishing Platform, 2011, .
 How Many Miles to Babylon? An Essay, Heinemann, 1990, .
 A Mask Dancing: Nigerian Novelists of the Eighties, Hans Zell Publishers, 1992. .
 From Khaki to Agbada: A handbook for the February, 1999 elections in Nigeria, Civil Liberties Organisation, 1999, .
 Remembering Ken Saro-Wiwa and Other Essays, New Gong, 2005, .
 A Peculiar Tragedy: J. P. Clark-Bekederemo and the Beginning of Modern Nigerian Literature in English, CreateSpace Independent Publishing Platform, 2013, .
 The House My Father Built, Kachifo Limited, 2014, .
As editor
 Christopher Okigbo: Collected Poems, Heinemann, 1986, .
 The Heinemann Book of African Poetry in English, Heinemann, 1990, .
 Who's Afraid of Wole Soyinka?: Essays on Censorship, Heinemann, 1991, .
 The New Gong Book of New Nigerian Short Stories, 2007, .
 Dream Chasers: New Nigerian Stories, Nelson, 2013, .

Short fiction 
Collections

Selected book reviews

References

External links
 Adewale Maja-Pearce blog
 Olatoun Gabi-Williams, "Adewale Maja-Pearce" (interview), Borders: Literature for all Nations.

Living people
1953 births
English people of Yoruba descent
20th-century essayists
21st-century essayists
Nigerian essayists
Nigerian journalists
Nigerian literary critics
Nigerian male short story writers
Nigerian short story writers
20th-century short story writers
20th-century male writers
21st-century male writers
London Review of Books people
Yoruba writers
Nigerian memoirists
St Gregory's College, Lagos alumni
Alumni of SOAS University of London
Writers from Lagos
Yoruba journalists
Alumni of Aberystwyth University
Black British writers
British emigrants to Nigeria